The 80th edition of the KNVB Cup (at the time called Amstel Cup) started on August 12, 1997. The final was played on May 17, 1998 and saw Ajax beat PSV 5–0 and won the cup for the thirteenth time. A total of 60 clubs participated.

Teams
 All 18 participants of the 1997–98 Eredivisie, six of which entering in the knock-out stage
 All 18 participants of the 1997–98 Eerste Divisie
 21 teams from lower (amateur) leagues
 Three youth teams

Group stage
The matches of the group stage were played between August 12 and September 7, 1997. 54 clubs participated, 26 advanced to the next round.

E Eredivisie; 1 Eerste Divisie; A Amateur teams

Knock-out stage

First round
The matches of the first round were played on November 18 and 19, 1997. The six highest Eredivisie teams from last season entered the tournament this round.

E six Eredivisie entrants

Round of 16
The matches of the round of 16 were played on February 4, 10 and 11, 1998.

Quarter finals
The quarter finals were played on March 11 and 12, 1998.

Semi-finals
The semi-finals were played on April 29 and May 7, 1998.

Third place match
Since finalists Ajax and PSV already qualified for the Champions League, this match for the third place was played to determine the Dutch participant for the last edition of the Cup Winners' Cup.

Final

Ajax also won the Dutch Eredivisie championship, thereby taking the double. They would participate in the Champions League. PSV ended second in the Eredivisie, and qualified for the Champions League as well.

See also
Eredivisie 1997-98
Eerste Divisie 1997-98

External links
 Results by RSSSF

KNVB Cup seasons
Knvb Cup, 1997-98
Knvb Cup, 1997-98